 is a Japanese photographer and educator. Sato is best known for his unusual expressions of light and space and interpretations of performance and dance.

Biography 
Tokihiro Sato was born on September 14, 1957 in Sakata, Yamagata Prefecture, Japan. Receiving his MFA and BFA degrees in Music and Fine Arts from Tokyo National University of Fine Arts and Music in 1981, Sato was originally a trained sculptor, but decided to go with photography to better communicate his ideas.

Recognised for his playful interaction of light, Sato uses a large-format camera for exposures that last from one to three hours, while he moves around the space creating illuminated lines drawn with flashlights. The results are detailed photographs interrupted by patterns of light. And because of the long exposures, Sato’s movements across the scene remain undetectable by the camera; the photograph captures his presence but not his image.

Sato’s photographs are held throughout the world in public and private museums including the Solomon R. Guggenheim Museum (New York); the Los Angeles County Museum of Art; the Museum of Fine Arts, Houston; The Art Institute of Chicago; the Cleveland Museum of Art; Museum of Modern Art (Saitama, Japan); Hara Museum of Contemporary Art (Tokyo); Queensland Art Gallery (Brisbane); and Tokyo Metropolitan Museum of Photography.  Solo museum exhibitions in the United States have taken place at the Cleveland Museum of Art (2003), The Art Institute of Chicago (2005), and the Frist Center for the Visual Arts in Nashville (2010).

He is currently a professor in the Inter-Media Art Department at the Tokyo University of the Arts.

Books
Tokihiro Sato: Trees, Leslie Tonkonow Artworks + Projects, New York, 2010. .
Sato, Tokihiro. Hikari–kokyū. Nikon Salon Books 24. Tokyo: Nikon, 1997. 
Sato, Tokihiro. Hikari–kokyū / Photo–Respiration. Tokyo: Bijutsu Shuppan, 1997. . 
Sato Tokihiro no manazashi "Hikari–kokyū". Sakata: Sakatashi Bijutsukan, 1999. 
Kokyū suru fūkei / Breathing landscapes. [Urawa]: Saitama Kenritsu Kindai Bijutsukan, 1999.
Siegel, Elizabeth. Photo Respiration: Tokihiro Sato Photographs. Chicago: The Art Institute of Chicago, 2005. .

Notes

References

 Gendai shashin no keifu II (現代写真の系譜II) / History of Modern Photos II. Nikon Salon Books 28. Tokyo: Nikon, Nikkor Club, 2001.  Pp. 90–92. In Japanese only, despite the alternative English-language title.
Nihon no shashin: Uchi naru katachi, soto naru katachi. 3: Gendai no keshiki, 1980–95 (日本の写真：内なるかたち・外なるかたち 第3部：現代の1980～95) / Japanese Photography: Form In/Out. 3: Contemporary Scenery, 1980–90. Tokyo: Tokyo Metropolitan Museum of Photography, 1996. Exhibition catalogue, texts and captions in Japanese and English. 
 Nihon shashinka jiten (日本写真家事典) / 328 Outstanding Japanese Photographers. Kyoto: Tankōsha, 2000. P. 156. . Despite its alternative title in English, the text is all in Japanese.
Tucker, Anne Wilkes, et al. The History of Japanese Photography. New Haven: Yale University Press, 2003. .

External links
Tokihiro Sato at Leslie Tonkonow Artworks + Projects, New York
Frist Center for the Visual Arts, Nashville, Tenn.
The Mysterious Light of Tokihiro Sato
"Breathing light": examples of Sato's work. 
Ono, Philbert. Review of Photo-Respiration. Photoguide Japan.
Ono, Philbert. " Satoh Tokihiro". Photoguide Japan.

1957 births
Japanese photographers
Living people
People from Yamagata Prefecture
Academic staff of Tokyo University of the Arts